Virachola is a group of butterfly species in the family Lycaenidae.  It was previously considered a valid genus, but recent authors consider it a subgenus of Deudorix.

Species include:
Virachola isocrates - common guava blue
Virachola perse - large guava blue

References

Deudorigini
Lycaenidae genera